In mathematics, the term undefined is often used to refer to an expression which is not assigned an interpretation or a value (such as an indeterminate form, which has the propensity of assuming different values). The term can take on several different meanings depending on the context. For example:
 In various branches of mathematics, certain concepts are introduced as primitive notions (e.g., the terms "point", "line" and "angle" in geometry). As these terms are not defined in terms of other concepts, they may be referred to as "undefined terms".
 A function is said to be "undefined" at points outside of its domainfor example, the real-valued function  is undefined for negative  (i.e., it assigns no value to negative arguments).
 In algebra, some arithmetic operations may not assign a meaning to certain values of its operands (e.g., division by zero). In which case, the expressions involving such operands are termed "undefined".

Undefined terms
In ancient times, geometers attempted to define every term. For example, Euclid defined a point as "that which has no part". In modern times, mathematicians recognize that attempting to define every word inevitably leads to circular definitions, and therefore leave some terms (such as "point") undefined (see primitive notion for more).

This more abstract approach allows for fruitful generalizations. In topology, a topological space may be defined as a set of points endowed with certain properties, but in the general setting, the nature of these "points" is left entirely undefined. Likewise, in category theory, a category consists of "objects" and "arrows", which are again primitive, undefined terms. This allows such abstract mathematical theories to be applied to very diverse concrete situations.

In arithmetic
The expression  is undefined in arithmetic, as explained in division by zero (the same expression is used in calculus to represent an indeterminate form).

Mathematicians have different opinions as to whether  should be defined to equal 1, or be left undefined.

Values for which functions are undefined
The set of numbers for which a function is defined is called the domain of the function. If a number is not in the domain of a function, the function is said to be "undefined" for that number.

In trigonometry 

In complex analysis 
In complex analysis, a point  where a holomorphic function is undefined is called a singularity. One distinguishes between removable singularities (i.e., the function can be extended holomorphically to ), poles (i.e., the function can be extended meromorphically to ), and essential singularities (i.e., no meromorphic extension to  can exist).

In computer science

Notation using ↓ and ↑

The symbols of infinity
In analysis, measure theory and other mathematical disciplines, the symbol  is frequently used to denote an infinite pseudo-number, along with its negative, . The symbol has no well-defined meaning by itself, but an expression like  is shorthand for a divergent sequence, which at some point is eventually larger than any given real number.

Performing standard arithmetic operations with the symbols  is undefined. Some extensions, though, define the following conventions of addition and multiplication:
 for all .
 for all .
 for all .

No sensible extension of addition and multiplication with  exists in the following cases:
 
  (although in measure theory, this is often defined as )
 
 
For more detail, see extended real number line.

References

Further reading

Mathematical terminology
Calculus